Býchory is a municipality and village in Kolín District in the Central Bohemian Region of the Czech Republic. It has about 600 inhabitants.

History

The first written mention of Býchory is from 1352.

Sights
Býchory Castle (also called Horskýsfeld) is a manor house, built in the Tudor neo-Gothic style in 1865. It was owned by Jan Kubelík in 1904–1916.

Notable people
Jan Kubelík (1880–1940), violinist and composer; lived here
Rafael Kubelík (1914–1996), Czech-Swiss conductor and composer

References

External links

Villages in Kolín District